Don't Go Breaking My Heart 2 is a 2014 romantic comedy film directed by Johnnie To. A sequel to the 2011 film Don't Go Breaking My Heart, it stars returning cast members Louis Koo, Gao Yuanyuan and Daniel Wu alongside new cast members Vic Chou and Miriam Yeung. It was screened at the Special Presentations section at the 2014 Toronto International Film Festival. It was released in China on 11 November and in Hong Kong on 13 November 2014.

Cast
 Louis Koo as Sean Cheung 
 Miriam Yeung as Yang Yang Yang
 Gao Yuanyuan as Cheng Zixin
 Vic Chou as Paul Cheng
 Daniel Wu as Fang Qihong
 Lam Suet as John
 Lo Hoi-pang as Security guard
 Liu Yuhong as Zixin's grandmother
 Yan Jingyao as Zixin's mother
 Wang Zhihua as Qihong's father
 Du Yachun as Qihong's mother

Production
Don't Go Breaking My Heart 2 was written by Wai Ka-fai and Ryker Chan and Yu Xi. Yu Xi had previously joined To’s on his films Blind Detective and Drug War as a screenwriter.

Release
Don't Go Breaking My Heart 2 was shown at the Toronto International Film Festival on 9 September 2014. The film was released on 11 November 2014 in China, which is Singles Day. The film earned RMB42.1 million (US$6.88 million) from approximately 1.32 million admissions on 11 November making it the best opening gross for a film directed by Johnnie To in Mainland China.

Reception
The Hollywood Reporter gave the film a negative review, stating that the "Chinese dreams of love, wealth and sex make this rom-com reboot look very much like a calculated piggy-bank stuffer." Slant Magazine gave the film a negative review, calling it "the worst film To has made since founding his independent studio Milkyway." Slant opined that "this sequel jumbles the stakes and loses its drive, not least because, while Shen-ren still pines for Zixin, Qihong toils away on the mainland completely divorced from the story."

Variety gave the film a mixed review, comparing the film to the first, stating that "much like the first time, the results are as cheerfully silly as they are compulsively watchable, despite the somewhat disappointing decision to keep one of the series’ most appealing stars (Daniel Wu) sidelined on the mainland for much of the running time." and that director Johnnie To " undisputed master of the modern Hong Kong gangster drama, turns his attention to lighter fare (like this, or 2012’s sudser "Romancing in Thin Air"), it’s like watching a great baseball pitcher warming up in the bullpen: perfect form and follow-through minus any real sizzle."

References

External links
 

2014 films
2014 romantic comedy films
Chinese romantic comedy films
Hong Kong romantic comedy films
2010s Cantonese-language films
2010s Mandarin-language films
Films directed by Johnnie To
Media Asia films
Milkyway Image films
Hong Kong sequel films
Chinese sequel films
Films with screenplays by Wai Ka-fai
2010s Hong Kong films